Mallotus megadontus is an Australian rainforest tree in the spurge family. It is known as the toothed mallotus and is native to South East Queensland. It is listed as vulnerable.

References

megadontus
Flora of Queensland
Trees of Australia
Malpighiales of Australia